Meteor-M No.2-1, was a Russian satellite, part of Meteor-M series of polar-orbit weather satellite. It was launched using Soyuz-2.1b rocket with a Fregat upper stage on 28 November 2017; the satellite failed to separate from the Fregat and communication was later lost.

The cause of failure was determined to be faulty programming. The satellite was programmed with a launch point of Baikonur Cosmodrome, instead of the Vostochny Cosmodrome causing the satellite to enter an incorrect orbit. This was the second launch from the Vostochny Cosmodrome, the first civilian launch site in Russia.

In addition to the ₽2.6bn Meteor-M weather satellite, 18 other scientific, research and commercial satellites from Russia, Norway, Sweden, the US, Japan, Canada and Germany were lost as well.

References

Weather satellites of Russia
2017 in Russia
Spacecraft launched in 2017
Satellite launch failures
Spacecraft launched by Soyuz-2 rockets